Clackamas High School (CHS) is a public high school located in Clackamas, Oregon, United States. The school itself was built in 2002, replacing an older, smaller building built in 1957 which is now Alder Creek Middle School. Starting in the 2010–2011 school year, the campus included the former building of Sunrise Middle School. During the 2021-2022 school year, the East Campus building turned into Rock Creek Middle School.

Building and campus
The building itself has  of floor space and is much larger than the older school. It has four classroom hallways on two floors, a commons area, an arts wing, and an athletic wing,  centered on an administrative ring in the middle of the school.

The classroom hallways are mostly on the north end of the school with 100 and 200 halls on the east side, and 300 and 420 halls on the west. The commons area is on the north side of the administrative offices, at the entrance to 100 and 200 halls, and is primarily used for dining and some multi-purpose use. The arts wing of the school is  centered on the schools' auditorium and contains rooms for art classes, choir classes, and band classes, as well as a wood shop, a stage shop, and changing and makeup rooms. The athletic wing contains a large gym, a smaller upper gym, locker rooms, a wrestling room, and a weight training room. The administrative ring, located in the center of the school, contains the main office, the bookkeeper's office, the attendance office, the student management office, the schools' career and vocation center, the athletic office, and the counseling office, all  centered on a small courtyard.

This building has served as a model for other high schools and has been designated a green building. Clackamas High School was built in 2002 to a design by Portland's Boora Architects and was the first high school in the country to be certified LEED Silver. Clackamas High became one of the first "solar schools" in Oregon with the installation of 2 kW solar panels on the roof in 2003. The School was also a winner of the DesignShare Recognized Value Award in 2003.

Academics
In 1984, Clackamas High School was honored in the Blue Ribbon Schools Program, the highest honor a school can receive in the United States.

As of 2005, 72.5% of 10th grade students at Clackamas High School met or exceeded overall state standards for learning, compared to 53.5% of the rest of the state. In addition, 80% are ESL students and 90% are Latino.

In 2008, 92% of the school's seniors received a high school diploma. Of 589 students, 502 graduated, 69 dropped out, four received a modified diploma, and 14 were still in high school the following year.

Nate Muñoz is the current principal of Clackamas High School since July 2020.

Awards and honors
In October 2005, Clackamas High was named KATU's "Super School of the Month."

In 1997, Clackamas High biology teacher Ford Morishita won the Oregon Teacher of the Year award, for his approach to teaching biology and the performance of his students.

Notable alumni
 Debby Applegate – historian and biographer
 Alexandra Botez – chess player
 Cazzey Louis Cereghino – actor, singer, and novelist
 Lisa Fletcher – television news journalist
 Lynn Snodgrass – politician, former Oregon State Speaker of the House
 Cheryl Sorensen – basketball coach
 Ben Wetzler – baseball player
 Hailey Kilgore – Broadway actress and singer
 Cole Turner – American football player

References

http://www.betterbricks.com
http://www.cascadesolar.com/solarschool.htm
https://web.archive.org/web/20051028052609/http://sabin.nclack.k12.or.us/
http://portland.indymedia.org/en/2004/10/299862.shtml
http://portland.indymedia.org/en/2004/10/301395.shtml
http://www.whitehousedrugpolicy.gov/news/oped3/081303.html
http://www.designshare.com/portfolio/project/details.asp?projid=339&projview=images

External links
 School website
 School report card
 Official school profile

Educational institutions established in 1957
High schools in Clackamas County, Oregon
School buildings completed in 2002
Public high schools in Oregon
1957 establishments in Oregon